Naranga is a developing village and gram panchayat in Parihar (Vidhan Sabha constituency), Sitamarhi district, Bihar, India.

Language And Culture
Bajjika dialect and Hindi is spoken by the people here.
Group of women sings in many occasions like marriage, Janeu etc.

Education
In Naranga there are many private and public schools. The family has to pay fees in private schools. Poor families without paying any fees send their children to public schools.
Aangan Wadi – 1- to 5-year-olds go to Aangan Wadi. They eat the rice, lentils and soybeans, as well as basic education is imparted.
High school – It is situated at 1 km north from RAMANA CHOWK.

Religion
Hindu and Muslim lives here with mankind and humanity.
Durga Mandir at Naranga Bazaar, Mahadev Math and many temple is here for Hindus. One Mosque for Muslims also here.

Festivals 
 Makar Sankranti
 Vasant Panchami
 Holi
 Eid-ul-Fitr
 Eid-ul-Adha
 Muharram
 Ram Navami
 Rakshabandhan
 Teej
 Maha Shivaratri
 Durga Puja
 Diwali
 Chhath
and several other local festivals as well.

Connectivity
Parwaha lalbandi road connect the area to National Highway 104 (India) in south and Nepal in north.

Naranga dostiya road connect the area to National Highway 77 (India).

The nearest railway station is Sitamarhi railway station.

The nearest airport to Naranga is the Darbhanga Airport which is about  distance.

Politics
Naranga play very important role in elections.
Naranga is sub divided into two Panchayat
Naranga Uttari
Naranga Dakshini

List of Mukhiya of Naranga Uttari

References

Villages in Sitamarhi district